More Than a Mood is an album by saxophonist Stanley Turrentine recorded in 1992 and released by the MusicMasters label.

Reception

AllMusic reviewer Scott Yanow stated "Turrentine is in top form on a variety of standards ... A fine session". The Sun-Sentinel's Matt Schudel wrote "The album never lags -- it is both hot and cool, smooth and spirited, all the way through".

Track listing
 "Thomasville" (Tommy Turrentine) – 5:26
 "They Can't Take That Away from Me" (George Gershwin, Ira Gershwin) – 8:57
 "In a Sentimental Mood" (Duke Ellington, Manny Kurtz, Irving Mills) – 7:28
 "Easy Walker" (Billy Taylor) – 5:57
 "Triste" (Antônio Carlos Jobim) – 5:45
 "Pieces of Dreams" (Michel Legrand, Alan Bergman, Marilyn Bergman) – 5:19
 "Spirits Up Above" (Rahsaan Roland Kirk) – 9:19
 "More Than a Mood" (Bill Simon, Frank Marino) – 6:58

Personnel 
Stanley Turrentine – tenor saxophone
Freddie Hubbard – trumpet, flugelhorn (tracks 1 & 7)
Cedar Walton – piano
Ron Carter – bass 
Billy Higgins – drums

References 

1992 albums
Stanley Turrentine albums
MusicMasters Records albums